La Horra is a Spanish town and municipality in the south of the province of Burgos, in the Ribera del Duero wine region and comarca.

Sources and external links
La Horra
Diputación de Burgos

References 

Municipalities in the Province of Burgos